Jon Corto (born September 3, 1984 in Orchard Park, New York) is a former American football linebacker. He was originally signed by the Buffalo Bills as an undrafted free agent in 2007. He played college football at Sacred Heart.

Early life
Corto played his high school football in Orchard Park, New York. He grew up a fan of the Buffalo Bills and lived only a few miles from the team's stadium.

College career
In his senior year, Corto had a team-leading 104 tackles, 54 solo, ranking second in the conference. He averaged 9.5 tackles per game with 4.5 sacks and 11.0 tackles for loss on the year. For his stellar senior year he received 2006 All-American honors as well as first-team All-Northeast Conference.

He finished his career at SHU as the program's second all-time leading tackler with 300 tackles over four years, he added 15 sacks as well.

Professional career
After impressing in rookie mini camp, Corto signed with the Buffalo Bills. Corto was converted to safety by the Bills, and was with the team's practice squad for the 2007 season.
In 2008, Corto was elevated to the teams active roster and appeared in all sixteen games, while primarily playing on special teams. Between 2008 and 2010 he appeared in 43 games, before spending the entire 2011 season on injured reserve.

The Bills released Corto in February 2012 and he subsequently retired.

Personal life
In 2011 Jon and his wife Jen founded Buffalo Strive Vending, a full service vending company that focuses on healthy options. The couple has three children together, two boys and a girl.

External links
Buffalo Bills bio
Jon Corto Official Home Page

References

1984 births
Living people
People from Orchard Park, New York
American football safeties
Sacred Heart Pioneers football players
Buffalo Bills players
Sportspeople from Erie County, New York